R. Rathnavelu is an Indian cinematographer who works predominantly in Tamil and Telugu films. His work in films such as  Sethu, Nandha, Vaaranam Aayiram, Enthiran, 1: Nenokkadine, Rangasthalam and Sye Raa Narasimha Reddy garnered recognition. He has garnered three Filmfare Awards South, the Vijay Awards, the Tamil Nadu State Film Award, two SIIMA Awards and the Kalaimamani Award bestowed by the Tamil Nadu state government for his work.

Education
Rathnavelu graduated with a Bachelor of Science degree in Physics and completed a three year Diploma in Film Technology in cinematography from the M.G.R. Government Film and Television Training Institute. He went on to assist cinematographer Rajiv Menon, for Mani Rathnam's Bombay.

Filmography

References

External links 
 Official Website
 

Artists from Chennai
Living people
Cinematographers from Tamil Nadu
Telugu film cinematographers
Filmfare Awards South winners
1971 births
Tamil Nadu State Film Awards winners
M.G.R. Government Film and Television Training Institute alumni
Hindi film cinematographers
Kannada film cinematographers
Tamil film cinematographers
Santosham Film Awards winners
South Indian International Movie Awards winners
Zee Cine Awards Telugu winners